Burns Bluff is a bluff on the west coast of Palmer Land, immediately to the south of Naess Glacier. It was named by the UK Antarctic Place-Names Committee for Frederick M. Burns, British Antarctic Survey geophysicist at Stonington Island, 1967–69.

References
 

Cliffs of Palmer Land